The Genie Award for Best Performance by a Foreign Actress was awarded by the Academy of Canadian Cinema and Television from 1980 to 1983, for the best performance by non-Canadian actress in a Canadian film.

The award and its Foreign Actor companion were frequently criticized both by actors and film critics — Canadian actor Christopher Plummer criticized the distinction in his Best Actor acceptance speech at the first Genies ceremony, and Jay Scott called them "loathsome", dubbing them "the Colonial Category", in a 1982 article in The Globe and Mail.

The awards were discontinued after the end of the 4th Genie Awards. Initially, non-Canadian actresses were simply barred from being nominated in acting categories at all, but beginning with the 7th Genie Awards non-Canadian actresses instead became eligible for the Genie Award for Best Performance by an Actress in a Leading Role and/or the Genie Award for Best Performance by an Actress in a Supporting Role.

Winners and nominees

References